Jafet Soto Molina (born April 1, 1976), is a Costa Rican football (soccer) coach, general manager and retired player who played for Club Sport Herediano.

Club career
In Costa Rica, Soto has only played for Herediano, where he is considered an idol by local fans. He left the club for a 10-year spell in the Mexican premier league, and played for teams such as Puebla (three stints), Monarcas Morelia (twice), Atlas, Pachuca and Tecos UAG.

In summer 2006, Soto joined Major League Soccer outfit Real Salt Lake and after several months in Salt Lake, Soto went back to his country Costa Rica, where he returned at Herediano as captain of this team. He announced his retirement in November 2008 and he played his final game was played on January 17, 2009 against Brujas where he scored a goal in the 19th minute that made Herediano win the match 1-0. He was substituted himself after scoring the goal.

International career
Soto played in the U-20 Football World Youth Championship held in Qatar in 1995

He made his senior debut for Costa Rica in a January 1994 friendly match against Norway and earned a total of 63 caps, scoring 10 goals. He represented his country in 21 FIFA World Cup qualification matches but injuries and bad luck came his way and denied him of playing in the 2002 FIFA World Cup. He played at the 1999, 2001 UNCAF Nations Cups and 2005 UNCAF Nations Cups as well as at the 2000 and 2005 CONCACAF Gold Cups and the 1997 Copa América.

His final international was an October 2005 FIFA World Cup qualification match against Guatemala.

Managerial career
In September 2011, Soto became Herediano's administrative manager. In May 2012 he took charge at Pérez Zeledón, only to leave them in August that year to take over at the Costa Rica U20s. In 2013, he became sports director of Herediano.

In August 2014, Soto returned at the helm at Herediano.

Honours

Individual
 CONCACAF Gold Cup Best XI (Honorable Mention): 2005

References

External links
 
 
 La Nacion

1976 births
Living people
People from San José, Costa Rica
Association football midfielders
Costa Rican footballers
Costa Rica international footballers
Costa Rica under-20 international footballers
Copa Centroamericana-winning players
1997 Copa América players
2001 UNCAF Nations Cup players
2005 UNCAF Nations Cup players
2005 CONCACAF Gold Cup players
C.S. Herediano footballers
Atlético Morelia players
Atlas F.C. footballers
C.F. Pachuca players
Club Puebla players
Tecos F.C. footballers
Real Salt Lake players
Costa Rican expatriate footballers
Expatriate footballers in Mexico
Expatriate soccer players in the United States
Costa Rican expatriate sportspeople in Mexico
Major League Soccer players
Liga MX players
Costa Rican football managers
C.S. Herediano managers